Verkhnyaya Salda is a town in Sverdlovsk Oblast, Russia, located on the Salda River (right tributary of the Tagil),  north of Yekaterinburg. Population:

History
It was founded in 1778; town status was granted to it in 1938. The settlement was founded around iron processing and iron cast factories. It attracted local population in search of jobs.

Further impulse of the industry development occurred during the WWII, when July 11th, 1941 Committee of Defense has decided to evacuate design bureaus, technical archive and machinery from Leningrad to a Verkhnyaya Salda.

Economy
Verkhnaya Salda is known for its metallurgical plant VSMPO-AVISMA Corporation—the world's largest producer of titanium.

References

Cities and towns in Sverdlovsk Oblast
Verkhotursky Uyezd